The Billion Dollar Ransom is the 73rd title of the Hardy Boys Mystery Stories, written by Franklin W. Dixon.  It was published by Wanderer Books in 1982.

Plot summary
The Hardy boys help out when a magicians' tournament is threatened by mysterious happenings. Frank and Joe naturally catch the magician who kidnapped the President and all culprits by slowly closing in on their position and taking control.

1982 American novels
The Hardy Boys books